Ağrı is a city in eastern Turkey, near the border with Iran. It is the seat of Ağrı Province and Ağrı District. Its population is 120,390 (2021). Formerly known as Karaköse from the early Turkish republican period until 1946, and before that as Karakilise, the city is now named after Ağrı, the Turkish name of Mount Ararat.

History
In the Ottoman Empire era, the area was called Karakilisa. The current town center was founded around 1860 by a group of Armenian merchants from Bitlis with the name Karakilise that became known to the local population as Karakise, and this version was turned officially to Karaköse at the beginning of the Republican era. This name was changed to Ağrı by 1946.

In the years of 1927 to 1931, the region was under the occupation of the Kurdish separatist movements, which gained to establish an unrecognized state named Republic of Ararat which was led by several Kurdish leaders, some of the Main were Ibrahim Heski and Ihsan Nuri.

In the medieval period, the district's administrative centre was located at Alashkert, once an important town. The "kara kilise" that gave the town its name was a medieval Armenian church. In 1895 H. F. B. Lynch stayed in Karakilise and wrote that it had between 1500 and 2000 inhabitants, was nearly two-thirds Armenian, and that a barracks for a locally recruited Kurdish Hamidiye regiment had been recently located in the town.

The Armenian population of the town and surrounding valley was massacred during the Armenian Genocide: a New York Times report from March 1915 talks of the Alashkert valley being covered with the bodies of men, women, and children.

Economy and infrastructure
Ağrı contains most of the industry in Ağrı Province where the main economic activity is Agriculture and Animal Husbandry. There is Ağrı Meat and Milk Factory and the ELDESAN leather factory is one of the biggest in the region. There is also a Sugar Factory, Shoe Factory Flour Mills, Agricultural Equipment manufacturing sites, brick factory, lime factory, furniture factory, dairy factory and textile mills.

In the south Ağrı counts with access to the Ağrı Ahmed-i Hani Airport in Yolluyazı. National and international flights arrive and depart from here.

North of Ağrı, there is a longwave broadcasting station with 2 250 metres tall guyed masts, broadcasting on 162 kHz with 1000 kW.

It is a very poor region with extremely cold winters. Most people live by grazing animals on the mountainside. Few people manage to attend university; people tend to marry in their teens and families with ten or more children are common. The local MP Fatma Salman Kotan has written of the need to erode the patriarchal nature of society in the region.

Climate 
Ağrı has a Mediterranean-influenced warm-summer humid continental climate (Dsb) under Köppen and a warm summer continental climate (Dcb) under Trewartha classification. Summers are generally brief but warm with cool nights. Winters are very cold. It snows a lot in winter, staying for an average of four months in the city. The highest recorded snow thickness was 225 cm ( 88.6 inches) on 21 February 1985.

Notable people
 Şakiro (1936-1996), Legendary Kurdish Dengbêj singer 
 Yaşar Ören (1942*), cross-country skier. 
 Celal Adan (1952*), Politician
 Nizamettin Ariç (1956*), contemporary Kurdish singer, composer and director.
 Abdullah Yilmaz (1961*), cross-country skier. 
 Erhan Dursun (1962*), cross-country skier.
 Cesim Gökçe (1968*), Politician
 Fatma Salman Kotan (1970*), Member of Parliament for Ağrı
 Savci Sayan (1971*), Politician and currently Mayor of Ağrı
 Şahe bedo (1976*), Kurdish Singer
 Mehmet Emin İlhan (1979*), Politician
 Berdan Öztürk (1980*), Politician
 Dirayet Taşdemir (1982*), Politician
 Türkan Erişmiş (1984*), middle distance runner 
 Adem Kılıçcı (1986*), amateur boxer in the middleweight division.
 Nesim Turan (1992*), para table tennis player
 Bayram Malkan (1994*), boxer in the light heavyweight 
 Zeynep Çelik (1996*), Paralympic judoka. 
 Kader Çelik (2001*), Paralympian goalball player

References

External links
 Ağrı 

 
Kurdish settlements in Turkey